Chin Yu-fang (born 19 August 1968) is a Taiwanese taekwondo practitioner. 

She won a bronze medal at the 1987 World Taekwondo Championships. She won a gold medal in finweight at the 1989 World Taekwondo Championships in Seoul, after defeating Mónica Torres in the final. She competed at the Asian Taekwondo Championships, winning a gold medal in 1986, and a silver medal in 1988.

References

External links

1968 births
Living people
Taiwanese female taekwondo practitioners
World Taekwondo Championships medalists
Asian Taekwondo Championships medalists
20th-century Taiwanese women